MZKS Narew 1962 Ostrołęka is a football (soccer) team currently playing in the IV liga Mazovia. The club was formed in 1962 as Narew Ostrołęka, but it was dissolved due to financial and organizational problems in 2015. On 8 September 2016, it was reactivated as MZKS Narew 1962 Ostrołęka, but it only cultivates the name and tradition of the previous Narew, and is not its continuator. Narew started after reactivation from Klasa B in 2017–18 season, achieving three promotions in four years.

In November 2004, a home match against Dolcan Ząbki was covered by nationwide commercial television station Tele5. This was thought to be the first Polish 4th Division match shown on television. The game ended 0–2.

The stadium on Witosa Street has capacity for 5,000 people, with 2,758 seated. The pitch measures 100 m x 70 m. Ostrołęka has over 50,000 citizens.

Noted managers 

Listed according to when they became managers for Narew Ostrołęka (year in parentheses):

 2003–2004: Adam Popławski
 2004–2005: Krzysztof Etmanowicz
 2005–2006: Bogusław Oblewski, Wojciech Łazarek
 2006–2007: Janusz Czapski, Waldemar Marczak and Krzysztof Etmanowicz, Sławomir Stanisławski
 2007–2008: Sławomir Stanisławski, Piotr Zajączkowski
 2008–2009: Cezary Moleda, Dariusz Janowski, Krzysztof Adamczyk
 2009–2010: Krzysztof Adamczyk, Mateusz Miłoszewski
 2010–2011: Mateusz Miłoszewski, Marcin Grabowski
 2011–2012: Marcin Grabowski, Kazimierz Puławski
 2012–2013: Marcin Roman
 2013–2014: Dariusz Narolewski
 2014–2015: Marian Szarama, Tomasz Słowik, Damian Dąbrowski
 2016–2018: Rafał Kosek
2018: Marian Szarama
2018–2020: Dariusz Narolewski
2020–2022: Andrzej Sieradzki
2022: Marek Marciniak
since 2022: Tomasz Staniórski

External links
 Club home page
 Narew Ostrołęka supporters site
 Narew Ostrołęka at the 90minut.pl website (Polish)

References 

Football clubs in Poland
Football clubs in Masovian Voivodeship
Association football clubs established in 1962
1962 establishments in Poland
Ostrołęka
Sport in Masovian Voivodeship